Käännän sivuu is the second studio album by Finnish rapper Cheek. It was released on 18 May 2005. The album peaked at number 17 on the Official Finnish Album Chart.

Track listing

Charts

Release history

References

2005 albums
Cheek (rapper) albums